Huttidare Kannada Nadal Huttabeku is a Kannada song composed and written by Hamsalekha for the 1993 film Aakasmika. It was sung by Kannada cinema's most celebrated actor, Dr. Rajkumar, who also performed to the song in the film. The song was considered a turning point in Kannada cinema and took Rajkumar's image to new heights.

In the song, the narrator asserts pride in being a Kannadiga. The chorus runs:

If you are to be born, take birth in the Kannada land;
If you are to step on, step on the Kannada soil;
This life is like a landaus (horse chariot);
Chariot that drives forward our fate.

Due to its themes representing the pride in being a Kannadiga, the song is widely embraced and still seen as the unofficial anthem for the Kannada people.

Picturisation
Rajkumar stars as Murthy, a police officer in the film. The song was shot at the Rani Chennamma circle and the Siddharoodh Math, in the city of Hubli, Karnataka. Murthy dressed in the traditional Kannadiga costume consisting of red-yellow coloured turban, white shirt and dhoti, sings the song.

Cultural references
 Shivarajkumar, the first son of Rajkumar performed to the remixed version of the song in his 2010 film, Cheluveye Ninne Nodalu.

External links

See also
 Art and culture of Karnataka

References

1993 songs
Kannada film songs